The Dublin Regulation (Regulation No. 604/2013; sometimes the Dublin III Regulation; previously the Dublin II Regulation and Dublin Convention) is a European Union (EU) law that determines which EU Member State is responsible for the examination of an application for asylum, submitted by persons seeking international protection under the Geneva Convention and the EU Qualification Directive, within the European Union. It is the cornerstone of the Dublin System, which consists of the Dublin Regulation and the EURODAC Regulation, which establishes a Europe-wide fingerprinting database for unauthorised entrants to the EU. The Dublin Regulation aims to "determine rapidly the Member State responsible [for an asylum claim]" and provides for the transfer of an asylum seeker to that Member State.

History
The Dublin regime was originally established by the Dublin Convention, which was signed in Dublin, Ireland on 15 June 1990, and first came into force on 1 September 1997 for the first twelve signatories (Belgium, Denmark, France, Germany, Greece, Ireland, Italy, Luxembourg, the Netherlands, Portugal, Spain and the United Kingdom), on 1 October 1997 for Austria and Sweden, and on 1 January 1998 for Finland. While the convention was only open to accession by member states of the European Communities, Norway and Iceland, non-member states, concluded an agreement with the EC in 2001 to apply the provisions of the Convention in their territories.

The Dublin II Regulation was adopted in 2003, replacing the Dublin Convention in all EU member states except Denmark, which has an opt-out from implementing regulations under the area of freedom, security and justice. An agreement with Denmark on extending the application of the Regulation to Denmark came into force in 2006. A separate protocol also extended the Iceland-Norway agreement to Denmark in 2006. The provisions of the Regulation were also extended by a treaty to non-member states Switzerland on 1 March 2008, which on 5 June 2005 voted by 54.6% to ratify it, and Liechtenstein on 1 April 2011. A protocol subsequently made this agreement also applicable to Denmark.

On 3 December 2008, the European Commission proposed amendments to the Dublin Regulation, creating an opportunity for reform of the Dublin System. The Dublin III Regulation (No. 604/2013) was approved in June 2013, replacing the Dublin II Regulation, and applies to all member states except Denmark. It came into force on 19 July 2013. It is based on the same principle as the previous two, i. e., that the first Member State where finger prints are stored or an asylum claim is lodged is responsible for a person's asylum claim.

In July 2017, the European Court of Justice upheld the Dublin Regulation, declaring that it still stands despite the high influx of 2015, giving EU member states the right to transfer migrants to the first country of entry to the EU.

The United Kingdom withdrawal from the European Union took effect at the end of the Brexit transition period on 31 December 2020, at which point the Regulation ceased to apply to it.

One of the principal aims of the Dublin Regulation is to prevent an applicant from submitting applications in multiple Member States. Another aim is to reduce the number of "orbiting" asylum seekers, who are shuttled from member state to member state. The country in which the asylum seeker first applies for asylum is responsible for either accepting or rejecting the claim, and the seeker may not restart the process in another jurisdiction.

Criticism
According to the European Council on Refugees and Exiles (ECRE) and the UNHCR the current system fails in providing fair, efficient and effective protection. 
Around 2008, those refugees transferred under Dublin were not always able to access an asylum procedure. This put people at risk of being returned to persecution.
The claim has been made on a number of occasions both by the ECRE and the UNHCR that the Dublin regulation impedes the legal rights and personal welfare of asylum seekers, including the right to a fair examination of their asylum claim and, where recognised, to effective protection, and leads to uneven distribution of asylum claims among Member States.

Application of this regulation can seriously delay the presentation of claims, and can result in claims never being heard. Causes of concern include the use of detention to enforce transfers of asylum seekers from the state where they apply to the state deemed responsible, also known as Dublin transfers, the separation of families and the denial of an effective opportunity to appeal against transfers. The Dublin system also increases pressures on the external border regions of the EU, where the majority of asylum seekers enter EU and where states are often least able to offer asylum seekers support and protection.

After ECRE, the UNHCR and other non-governmental organisations openly criticised Greece's asylum system, including the lack of protection and care for unaccompanied children, several countries suspended transfers of asylum seekers to Greece under the Dublin II regulation. Norway announced in February 2008 it would stop transferring any asylum seeker back to Greece under the Dublin II regulation. In September, it backtracked and announced that transfers to Greece would be based on individual assessments. In April 2008 Finland announced a similar move.

The regulation is also criticised by the Council of Europe Commissioner for Human Rights as undermining refugee rights.

The European Court of Human Rights in the case M.S.S. v Belgium and Greece, judged on 21 January 2011 that both the Greek and the Belgian governments violated the European Convention on Human Rights by applying the EU's own law on asylum seekers and were given fines of €6,000 and €30,000, respectively. Recently, voices have been heard calling for the imposition of tougher sanctions, should similar cases of trying to follow EU asylum laws occur in the future.

Dublin Regulation and the European refugees crisis 

Around 23 June 2015 during the European refugee and migrant crisis, Hungary considered itself overburdened with asylum applications after receiving 60,000 "illegal immigrants" that year and announced to no longer receive back applicants who had crossed the borders to other EU countries and were detained there, as they should according to the Dublin regulation, due to unspecified "technical reasons", thus practically withdrawing from that Dublin regulation. On 24 August 2015, Germany therefore decided to make use of the "sovereignty clause" to process Syrian asylum applications for which it would not be responsible under the criteria of the Regulation. On 2 September 2015, the Czech Republic also decided to offer Syrian refugees who had already applied for asylum in other EU countries and who had reached the country to either have their application processed in the Czech Republic (i. e. get asylum there) or to continue their journey elsewhere.

States such as Hungary, Slovakia and Poland also officially stated their opposition to any possible revision or enlargement of the Dublin Regulation, specifically referring to the eventual introduction of new mandatory or permanent quotas for solidarity measures.

In April 2018 at a public meeting of the Interior-Committee of the German Bundestag, expert witness Kay Hailbronner, asked about a future European asylum system, described the current state of the Dublin Regulation as dysfunctional. Hailbronner concluded, that once the EU has been reached, travelling to the desired destination, where the chances for being granted full refugee status are best and better living conditions are expected, was common practice. Sanctions for such travel were practically non-existent. Even if already deported, a return to the desired nation could be organized.

2019 statistics

In 2019, the European Union (EU) Member States sent out 142 494 outgoing requests to transfer the responsibility to examine an asylum application and effectively implemented 23 737 outgoing transfers to other Member States.

The largest numbers of outgoing requests using the Dublin procedure were sent by Germany (48 844), France (48 321), each representing close to one-third of the total number of outgoing requests recorded in 2019. They were followed by Belgium (11 882) and the Netherlands (9 267). These four Member States together sent more than four-fifths (83%) of all outgoing requests in 2019.

See also 

Asylum shopping
Child migration
European Convention on Nationality
List of international and European law on child protection and migration
Refugee law
Schengen area
Transnational child protection
Unaccompanied minor

Further reading

References

External links 
 Text of the 1990 Dublin Convention, repealed by Council Regulation (EC) No 343/2003
 Council Regulation (EC) No. 343/2003 of 18 February 2003 establishing the criteria and mechanisms for determining the Member State responsible for examining an asylum application lodged in one of the Member States by a third-country national, repealed by Regulation (EU) No 604/2013 of the European Parliament and of the Council of 26 June 2013
 Regulation (EU) No 604/2013 of the European Parliament and of the Council of 26 June 2013 establishing the criteria and mechanisms for determining the Member State responsible for examining an application for international protection lodged in one of the Member States by a third-country national or a stateless person, the current Dublin regulation
 Logics of Decision-making on Community Asylum Policy: A Case Study of the Evolvement of the Dublin II Regulation University of Oslo: ARENA Working Paper 03/2006
 European Council on Refugees and Exiles's (ECRE) position on the Dublin Regulation
 Fact sheet from the Irish Refugee Council
 Factsheet on "Dublin" cases before the European Court of Human Rights
 Article about an alternative to the distribution system of the Dublin II Regulation (Katapult-Magazine, 2015-04-07)

Right of asylum legislation
European Union regulations
2003 in law
2003 in the European Union
Right of asylum in the European Union
Terminated or expired founding treaties of the European Union